Chibeze Ezekiel (born ) is a Ghanaian environmental activist and a 2020 Goldman Environmental Prize award recipient for Africa. He is known to have challenged the Ghanaian Ministry of Environment to cancel the construction of a coal plant through activism.

Life and career 
He is the founder of Strategic Youth Network for Development, a youth centered organization for environmental and social change in Ghana. He was also the National Coordinator of 350 Ghana Reducing Our Carbon (350 GROC) He is the chair of Youth in Natural Resource and Environmental Governance (Youth-NREG). He serves as Panel Member of International Experts on the Environment of Peace 2022 (EP 2022) project.

Activism 
The government of Ghana in 2013 proposed the construction of 700 MW coal power plant and adjoining port in Aboabo in Ekumfi district. The project which was proposed by the Volta River Authority and Shenzen Energy Group. The project required $1.5 Billion loan from China African Development Fund. The project was going to be the first of a kind in Ghana which has no coal reserves hence there would be importation of raw material annually from South Africa estimated to be about 2 million tons.

Chibeze led grassroots to campaign against the construction of a coal-fired power station in Ghana. He worked with the local communities educating them on the damage the coal-fired power station would have caused. He further requested that the government switch to renewable energy.

In 2022 , he was a possible contender according to experts as an environmental activist for Nobel Peace Prize.

External links 

 Time with Chibeze,First Ghanaian to join 350.org Board
We are African Borns
Chibeze Ezekiel - Goldman Prize Recipient
TED talk - A vision for sustainable Energy in Africa
Speaking up: Ghana's social media voices
Citi TV : Time with Chibeze Ezekiel

References 

Goldman Environmental Prize awardees
Living people
Ghanaian environmentalists
Year of birth missing (living people)